The following is a list of United States cities, towns, and census-designated places in which a majority (over 50%) of the population is Hispanic or Latino, according to data from the 2000 Census.  This list does not include cities such as Los Angeles, California or Houston, Texas in which, according to the 2000 Census, merely a plurality (as opposed to a majority) of the residents are Hispanic.  The list below is organized by state and, within each state, by population size.  The percentage of each city's population that is Hispanic is listed in parentheses next to the city's name. The largest incorporated city with the highest proportion of Hispanics is Huron (population 6,306), California; according to the 2000 U.S. Census, Huron is 98.27% Hispanic. The largest city with a Hispanic majority is San Antonio, Texas, and the highest percentage for any major U.S. city is El Paso, Texas at 76%. Thirty-one states do not have any communities that are majority-Hispanic.  The following demographics are from the 2000 census.

Note: According to the U.S. Census, Hispanics can be of any race.

Arizona

Arizona places with between 10,000 and 25,000 people
Douglas (86.0%)
Drexel Heights (60.1%)
Eloy (74.4%)
Nogales (93.6%)
San Luis (89.1%)

Arizona places with fewer than 10,000 people
Ash Fork (51.4%)
Clifton (55.9%)
Drexel-Alvernon (58.1%)
Dudleyville (59.0%)
El Mirage (66.9%)
Gadsden (93.8%)
Gila Bend (52.6%)
Guadalupe (72.3%)
Hayden (84.5%)
Littletown (50.5%)
Mammoth (73.0%)
Maricopa (70.4%)
Miami (54.4%)
Mojave Ranch Estates (78.6%)
Naco (82.5%)
Pirtleville (95.0%)
Poston (77.1%)
Rio Rico Northeast (67.1%)
Rio Rico Northwest (87.3%)
Rio Rico Southeast (85.0%)
Rio Rico Southwest (85.1%)
Somerton (95.2%)
South Tucson (81.2%)
Stanfield (61.6%)
Summit (63.5%)
Superior (69.1%)
Tacna (50.8%)
Tolleson (78.0%)
Tumacacori-Carmen (58.0%)
Valencia West (68.4%)
Winkelman (74.7%)

California
See List of California communities with Hispanic majority populations in the 2000 census

Colorado

Colorado places with between 10,000 and 25,000 people
Commerce City (52.9%)

Colorado places with fewer than 10,000 people
Alamosa East (54.4%)
Antonito (90.3%)
Avondale (64.1%)
Blanca (67.0%)
Center (86.1%)
Del Norte (57.4%)
Fort Garland (72.2%)
Garden City (68.3%)
Gilcrest (54.9%)
Granada (62.5%)
La Jara (62.9%)
Log Lane Village (52.8%)
Monte Vista (58.2%)
Red Cliff (61.9%)
Rocky Ford (57.1%)
Romeo (77.1%)
Salt Creek (79.3%)
San Luis (88.8%)
Starkville (64.1%)
Walsenburg (51.0%)

Florida

Places with over 100,000 people
 Hialeah (92.3%)
 Miami (65.8%)

Places with between 25,000 and 100,000 people
Country Club (60.3%) 
Fontainebleau (87.2%) 
Homestead (51.8%)
Kendale Lakes (76.6%) 
Kendall West (79.0%)
Kendall (50.0%)
Miami Beach (53.5%)
Richmond West (70.0%) 
South Miami Heights (56.2%)
Tamiami (87.0%) 
The Hammocks (65.3%)
University Park (82.7%) 
Westchester (85.3%)

Places with fewer than 25,000 people
Buenaventura Lakes (54.6%)
Coral Terrace (82.1%) 
Country Walk (56.1%) 
Dade City North (56.5%)
Doral (67.4%)
Dover (50.1%)
Fellsmere (73.0%)
Glenvar Heights (55.5%) 
Harlem Heights (55.0%)
Hialeah Gardens (89.8%)
Immokalee (71.0%)
Leisure City (65.3%)
Meadow Woods (52.8%)
Medley (72.6%)
Miami Lakes (66.5%)
Miami Springs (59.6%)
Naples Manor (69.3%)
Olympia Heights (76.3%) 
Palm Springs North (64.9%) 
Pierson (62.4%)
Sunset (69.7%) 
Sweetwater (93.2%)
The Crossings (56.1%) 
Virginia Gardens (67.3%)
West Miami (84.0%)
Westwood Lakes (76.3%) 
Wimauma (72.9%)
Zolfo Springs (53.6%)

Georgia

Places with fewer than 25,000 people
Chamblee (56.4%)

Idaho

Places with fewer than 25,000 people
Hamer (50.0%)
Minidoka (77.5%)
Roberts (57.5%)
Wilder (76.4%)

Illinois

Places with between 25,000 and 100,000 people
Cicero (78.4%)

Places with fewer than 25,000 people
Melrose Park (53.9%)
Stone Park (79.1%)
Fairmont City (55.4%)

Indiana

Places with between 25,000 and 100,000 people
East Chicago (51.6%)

Maryland

Places with fewer than 25,000 people
Langley Park (63.4%)

Massachusetts

Places with between 25,000 and 100,000 people
Lawrence (59.7%)

Nebraska

Places with fewer than 25,000 people
Lexington (51.2%)

Nevada

Places with fewer than 25,000 people
West Wendover (56.9%)

New Jersey

Places with over 100,000 people
Paterson (50.1%)

Places with between 25,000 and 100,000 people
North Bergen (57.3%)
Passaic (62.5%)
Perth Amboy (69.8%)
Union City (82.3%)
West New York (78.7%)

Places with fewer than 25,000 people
Dover (57.9%)
Guttenberg (54.3%)
Victory Gardens (50.6%)

New Mexico
See List of New Mexico communities with Hispanic majority populations

New York

Places with between 25,000 and 100,000 people
Brentwood (54.3%)

Places with 10,000 to 25,000 people
Haverstraw (59.3%)
North Bay Shore (50.8%)

Oregon

Places with 10,000 to 25,000 people
Woodburn (50.1)

Places with fewer than 10,000 people
Boardman (50.1%)
Gervais (65.2%)
Labish Village (52.4%)
Malin (54.1%)
Nyssa (57.2%)

Texas
See List of Texas communities with Hispanic majority populations

Utah

Places with fewer than 10,000 people
Wendover (68.6%)

Virginia

Places with fewer than 10,000 people
Seven Corners, Virginia (50.1%)

Washington

Places with between 25,000 and 100,000 people
Pasco (56.3%)

Places fewer than 25,000 people
Basin City (76.1%)
Brewster (59.5%)
Bridgeport (64.8%)
George (60.2%)
Grandview (68.0%)
Granger (85.5%)
Mabton (89.0%)
Mattawa (89.8%)
Mesa (59.3%)
Othello (63.8%)
Quincy (64.7%)
Royal City (78.2%)
Sunnyside (73.1%)
Tieton (54.3%)
Toppenish (75.7%)
Wapato (76.2%)
Warden (71.8%)

References

Hispanic